Disciple is a 2013 Finnish Swedish-language drama film directed by Ulrika Bengts. The film was selected as the Finnish entry for the Best Foreign Language Film at the 86th Academy Awards, but it was not nominated.

Cast
Niklas Groundstroem as Lighthouse Chief Hasselbond
Patrik Kumpulainen as Gustaf Hasselbond
Erik Lönngren as Karl Berg
Amanda Ooms as Dorrit Hasselbond
Sampo Sarkola as Lecturer Ajander
Ping Mon Wallén as Emma Hasselbond
Philip Zandén as Captain Hallström

See also
List of submissions to the 86th Academy Awards for Best Foreign Language Film
List of Finnish submissions for the Academy Award for Best Foreign Language Film

References

External links

2013 films
2013 drama films
Finnish thriller drama films
2010s Swedish-language films
Swedish-language films from Finland